McAllen Stadium is a high school football stadium in McAllen, Texas, United States. It has been used for college and high school football and soccer games and track and field meets. The stadium contains a full track and full-color video scoreboard. It is owned and operated by McAllen Independent School District, and is the home stadium for the football teams from McAllen High School, James "Nikki" Rowe High School, and McAllen Memorial High School. Memorial Stadium is the largest stadium in the Rio Grande Valley.

From 1981 to 1985, the stadium played host to the NCAA Division II Football Championship, known as the Palm Bowl during its five-year stay in McAllen.

McAllen Veterans Memorial Stadium is among the largest high school football stadiums by capacity in Texas:

References

External links
 McAllen ISD webpage

High school football venues in Texas
Sports venues in Texas
Buildings and structures in McAllen, Texas